Checkout 19 is the debut novel of the British writer Claire-Louise Bennett.  It was selected for The New York Timess "10 Best Books of 2022" list.

References

2021 British novels
2021 debut novels
Jonathan Cape books